Events from the year 1722 in Ireland

Incumbent
Monarch: George I

Events
William Wood commences the minting (in London) of copper halfpence and farthings for circulation in Ireland.

Births

May 29 – James FitzGerald, 1st Duke of Leinster, politician (d. 1773)
Sir John Blackwood, 2nd Baronet, politician (d. 1799)

Deaths
March 11 – John Toland, philosopher (b. 1670)

References

 
Years of the 18th century in Ireland
Ireland
1720s in Ireland